Trichromia sithnides is a moth of the family Erebidae first described by Herbert Druce in 1896. It is found in Brazil, Suriname, Peru and French Guiana.

Subspecies
Trichromia sithnides sithnides (Peru)
Trichromia sithnides lavendulae (Rothschild, 1909) (Brazil, Suriname, Peru)
Trichromia sithnides meridionalis (Rothschild, 1909) (Brazil)
Trichromia sithnides disjuncta (Talbot, 1928) (Brazil)

References

sithnides
Moths described in 1896
Moths of South America